Givi Gumbaridze (born 22 March 1945) is a former Soviet and Georgian politician. He served as First Secretary of the Georgian Communist Party from 14 April 1989 to 7 December 1990. Prior to that he had served as the head of the Georgian KGB.

Notes

References
 

1945 births
Living people
20th-century politicians from Georgia (country)
First Secretaries of the Georgian Communist Party
Politicians from Tbilisi
KGB officers
Soviet politicians